Ma Sang-hoon (born 25 July 1991 in South Korea) is a South Korean professional footballer who is last known to have been contracted to Sangju Sangmu of the K League 1.

BBCU F.C.
Going back to BBCU F.C. of the Thai Premier League for the 2016 season, Sang-hoon made his debut for the Pink Panthers in a 2–0 victory over Sisaket, saying that Thai football has not changed that much since his 2013 spell with BBCU.

Sang-hoon returned to South Korea after BBCU was disbanded on account of depleted funds in 2017.

References

External links 
 at Footballdatabase.eu

Living people
Association football defenders
Ma Sang-hoon
Expatriate footballers in Thailand
South Korean footballers
1991 births
Ma Sang-hoon
South Korean expatriate footballers
South Korean expatriate sportspeople in Thailand
Gangwon FC players
Jeonnam Dragons players
Gimcheon Sangmu FC players
Suwon FC players
K League 1 players
K League 2 players